The University of Florida College of Pharmacy is the pharmacy school of the University of Florida. The College of Pharmacy was founded in 1923 and is located on the university's Gainesville, Florida main campus. The college offers the entry-level Doctor of Pharmacy (Pharm.D.) degree as the first professional degree for students entering the profession. The college offered a Working Professional Pharm.D. (WPPD) program for bachelor's-trained pharmacists already in practice with its last cohort of students enrolled in 2016. Additionally, various graduate degrees are offered. The professional program is fully accredited by the American Council on Pharmaceutical Education. Since 2011 the college has been offering online degree programs at the graduate level, such as the Forensic Science Program, Pharmaceutical Chemistry Program and Clinical Toxicology Program. In total the College of Pharmacy received over $32 million in total Research Revenues in 2021.

The College of Pharmacy is one of six schools that compose the J. Hillis Miller Health Science Center. In addition, there are two campus sites in Jacksonville and Orlando.

U.S. News & World Report (2020 edition)

U.S. News & World Report ranks the College of Pharmacy at fifth overall.

Degree Programs 
The College of Pharmacy offers three degree programs: Doctor of Pharmacy (Pharm.D.) Doctor of Philosophy (Ph.D.) and Master of Science (M.S.).

Doctor of Pharmacy 
In total, the college has 1,018 Pharm.D. students spread throughout Gainesville, Orlando and Jacksonville. First- to third-year Pharm.D. students study at one of the three campuses, and fourth-year students rotate throughout the state and nation for their clinical practice experiences. Many UF Pharm.D. graduates practice in community pharmacy settings, with the remaining graduates choosing a variety of roles, including academia, hospitals, ambulatory clinics, the pharmaceutical industry, the Food and Drug Administration and others. For five consecutive years (2016 to 2020), the UF College of Pharmacy ranked No. 1 nationally in the number of graduates securing highly competitive pharmacy residency positions.

Master of Science 
Since 2000, the college has developed a master's degree and certificate programs using distance learning technologies. The online graduate programs include M.S. degree and certificate programs in forensic sciences, pharmaceutical chemistry, clinical toxicology, pharmaceutical outcomes and policy, precision medicine and medication therapy management.

The eight self-supporting programs have 1,025 student and generate nearly $10 million annually, which enables the building of support infrastructure for course development and delivery as well as student affairs.

Doctor of Philosophy 
The college's 109 Ph.D. students receive training in one of the college's graduate programs under the mentorship of more than 50 graduate faculty.

Research 
Research activities in the UF College of Pharmacy span the life cycle of a drug, including areas such as medicinal chemistry, pharmaceutics, pharmacology, clinical and translational research, and pharmaceutical outcomes and policy. The college achieved a record $32 million in total grant funding in 2019. The American Association of Colleges of Pharmacy ranks UF No. 3 nationally in NIH funding and federal funding and No. 3 nationally in total research funding. Researchers in the college use scientific approaches to improve the treatment of diverse diseases through drug discovery, marine natural products, pharmacology, developing models of disease, pharmacokinetics/pharmacometrics, pharmacogenomics and precision medicine, pharmacoepidemiology and patient safety research. Five  centers support these research programs:

 Center for Drug Evaluation and Safety
 Center for Integrative Cardiovascular and Metabolic Disease
 Center for Natural Products, Drug Discovery and Development
 Center for Pharmacogenomics and Precision Medicine
 Center for Pharmacometrics and Systems Pharmacology

Campuses 
The College of Pharmacy has three campuses — in Gainesville, Jacksonville and Orlando — where Pharm.D. students study the same curriculum through simultaneous learning. Classes on the three campuses connect synchronously through videoconferencing, with faculty present at each campus.

Gainesville 
The University of Florida's Gainesville campus began offering pharmacy degrees in 1923. The pharmacy campus is part of UF Health, which is the country's only academic health center with six health-related colleges (Medicine, Nursing, Public Health and Health Professions, Dentistry, and Veterinary Medicine), nine research centers and institutes and 10 hospitals.

The Gainesville pharmacy campus has more than 500 Pharm.D. students enrolled with 130 new pharmacy students admitted each fall semester.

Jacksonville 
The Jacksonville campus began offering Pharm.D. degrees in 2002. It is located on the campus of UF Health Jacksonville, where students have access to a UF medical library, modern labs, two on-campus pharmacies, and teaching classrooms and auditoriums.

The Jacksonville campus has approximately 200 Pharm.D. students enrolled with 40-50 new students admitted each fall semester to the Pharm.D. program.

Orlando 
The Orlando campus began offering Pharm.D. degrees in 2002. It is located on the UF Research and Academic Center at Lake Nona campus. The campus has a total program enrollment of 280 students enrolled and admits approximately 70 new students each year in the fall semester.

See also 

 Infectious Disease Pharmacokinetics Laboratory
 University of Florida College of Dentistry
 University of Florida College of Medicine
 University of Florida College of Nursing
 University of Florida College of Public Health and Health Professions
 University of Florida College of Veterinary Medicine

References

External links
Official College of Pharmacy Page
UF Health
Gainesville Sun info about the College
History of the College
Branch location in Jacksonville
Overview of the College
USPHARMD Profile
Capital Campaign info for the College

Pharmacy
Pharmacy schools in Florida
Educational institutions established in 1923
1923 establishments in Florida